The Judge Felix Poché Plantation House is a historic house in Convent, Louisiana. It was built c. 1870 and placed on the National Register of Historic Places on December 3, 1980. The house's name derives from its ownership by Louisiana Supreme Court Justice Felix Pierre Poché, who was best known for having participated in the founding of the American Bar Association, in 1877–78.

See also
National Register of Historic Places listings in St. James Parish, Louisiana

References

Houses on the National Register of Historic Places in Louisiana
Renaissance Revival architecture in Louisiana
Houses completed in 1870
Houses in St. James Parish, Louisiana
National Register of Historic Places in St. James Parish, Louisiana